In Search of the Lost Chord is the third album by The Moody Blues, released in July 1968 on the Deram label.

Content
In Search of the Lost Chord is a concept album around a broad theme of quest and discovery, including world exploration ("Dr. Livingstone, I Presume"), music and philosophy through the ages ("House of Four Doors"), lost love ("The Actor"), spiritual development ("Voices in the Sky"), knowledge in a changing world ("Ride My See-Saw"), higher consciousness ("Legend of a Mind"), imagination ("The Best Way to Travel"), and space exploration ("Departure"). Space exploration would go on to become the theme of the group's 1969 album To Our Children's Children's Children, inspired by and dedicated to the Apollo 11 mission. The mysterious "lost chord" of the title is revealed to be the mantra "Om" (in the last stanza of Graeme Edge's poem "The Word"). According to keyboardist Mike Pinder, the title was inspired by Jimmy Durante's humorous song "I'm the Guy that Found the Lost Chord", itself a reference to "The Lost Chord" by Sir Arthur Sullivan.

Recording
Sessions for the album commenced in January 1968 with the recording of Thomas's "Legend of a Mind". Whereas the London Festival Orchestra had supplemented the group on Days of Future Passed, the Moody Blues played all instruments themselves (approximately 33) on In Search of the Lost Chord. Indian instruments such as the sitar (played by guitarist Justin Hayward), the tambura (played by Mike Pinder) and the tabla (played by drummer and percussionist Graeme Edge) made audio appearances on several tracks (notably "Departure", "Visions of Paradise" and "Om"). Other instruments unusual for this group were also used, notably the oboe (played by percussionist/flute player Ray Thomas) and the cello (played by bassist John Lodge, who tuned it as a bass guitar). The mellotron, played by Pinder, produced many string and horn embellishments.

Having already experimented with spoken word interludes on "Morning Glory" and "Late Lament" on Days of Future Passed, the group tried the practice again on the Graeme Edge-penned pieces "Departure" and "The Word". The latter was recited by Pinder, who was the primary reciter of Edge's poems on this and other Moody Blues albums. "Departure", which escalates from mumbling to hysterical laughter obscuring the final words (presumably "to find the lost chord"), is a rare studio example of Edge reciting his own words.

Release

In Search of the Lost Chord was released on 26 July 1968. It peaked at number 5 in the UK Albums Chart and reached number 23 on the Billboard 200. Neither of the two singles from the album, "Ride My See-Saw" and "Voices in the Sky", charted in the top 40 on the Billboard charts, although the latter reached number 27 on the UK singles chart.

In Search of the Lost Chord was remastered into SACD in March 2006 and repackaged into a 2-CD Deluxe Edition. Although the other Moody Blues albums released in Deluxe Editions in 2006 featured their original quadrophonic mix (encoded as 5.1 surround sound), In Search of the Lost Chord had never been released in this format, and a new mix was not released until 2018 when a 5.1 mix was released as part of the 50th anniversary box set. In 2008, a remaster for single standard audio CD was issued with the nine bonus tracks.

In November 2018, the album was reissued as a five-disc In Search of the Lost Chord - 50th Anniversary Box Deluxe Edition set.

Legacy
In the Q and Mojo Classic Special Edition Pink Floyd & The Story of Prog Rock, the album was placed at number 37 in its list of "40 Cosmic Rock Albums".

Track listing

Personnel

Musicians
Mike Pinder – vocals, Mellotron, piano, harpsichord, acoustic guitar, bass guitar, cello, autoharp, tambura, spoken vocals
Ray Thomas – vocals, C flute, alto flute, soprano saxophone, oboe, French horn, tambourine
Justin Hayward – vocals, guitars, sitar, harpsichord, bass, percussion, Mellotron, piano
John Lodge – vocals, bass guitar, acoustic guitar, cello, snare drum, tambourine
Graeme Edge - vocals, drums, timpani, tambourine, piano, percussion, tabla, spoken vocal

Technical
Tony Clarke – liner notes, production
 Derek Varnals – engineering
 Adrian Martins – assistant engineer
 Phil Travers – cover design, cover painting

Charts

Certifications

References

External links
 

The Moody Blues albums
1968 albums
Albums produced by Tony Clarke (producer)
Concept albums
Deram Records albums